Sarah Louise Trigger (born 12 June 1968) is a retired British actress. Her film appearances include Bill & Ted's Bogus Journey, Pet Sematary Two, Deadfall and Things to Do in Denver When You're Dead.

Biography
Trigger began her career in the early 1990s, mainly participating in American film and television productions. Her film credits include movies like Bill & Ted's Bogus Journey, Deadfall, Things to Do in Denver When You're Dead, Pet Sematary Two, El Diablo and Grand Canyon. On television, she made appearances in series such as Monsters, 21 Jump Street, Chicago Hope and Turks.

She was married to American actor Jon Cryer from 1999 to 2004. The couple had a son, Charlie Austin.

Filmography

Film

Television

References

External links

1968 births
British film actresses
British television actresses
Living people